Bishop Yaroslav Pryriz  (born 30 March 1963 in Lastivka, Turka Raion, Lviv Oblast, Ukrainian SSR) is the Eparchial bishop of Ukrainian Catholic Eparchy of Sambir – Drohobych since 27 October 2011.

Life
Working at a state job as a technician, he simultaneously studied in the underground seminary in Lviv. On 4 December 1988 he received priestly ordination at the hands of Bishop Mykhaylo Sabryha. Then he joined the Redemptorists Congregation in 1992.

On 29 April 2006 he received episcopal consecration at the hands of Major Archbishop Lubomyr Husar. He was appointed Auxiliary bishop of the Ukrainian Catholic Eparchy of Sambir – Drohobych with title of Auzia. On 21 April 2010 he was elected as the Coadjutor bishop at the same Eparchy.

Since 27 October 2011 he is serving as the Eparch of this Eparchy.

References

External links

1963 births
Living people
People from Lviv Oblast
Ukrainian Eastern Catholics
Redemptorist bishops
Bishops of the Ukrainian Greek Catholic Church